Electric Connection is one of four American recordings Jean-Luc Ponty made in 1969. In 1969 was it was released on vinyl by World Pacific Jazz and reissued in 1993 on CD by One Way Records.

Track listing

Side one
 "Summit Soul" (Jean-Luc Ponty) – 4:55
 "Hypomode del Sol" (Jean-Luc Ponty) – 6:27
 "Scarborough Fair/Canticle" (Art Garfunkel, Paul Simon) – 3:02
 "The Name of the Game" (Dave Grusin) – 5:27

Side two
 "The Loner" (Ronnie Mathews, Cedar Walton) – 4:29
 "Waltz for Clara" (Jean-Luc Ponty) – 5:09
 "Forget" (Don Sebesky) – 4:25
 "Eighty-One" (Ron Carter) – 6:35

Personnel
 Jean-Luc Ponty – violin
 George Duke – piano
 Wilbert Longmire – guitar
 Bob West – bass
 Paul Humphrey – drums
 Tony Ortega – flute
 Bud Shank – alto saxophone
 Richard Aplan – baritone saxophone
 William Peterson, Tony Rusch, Larry McGuire, Paul Hubinon – trumpet
 Frank Strong – trombone
 Thurman Green – trombone
 Mike Wimberly – bass trombone

Technical
 Gerald Wilson – arranger, conductor
 Lanky Linatrot – engineer
 Richard Bock – producer

References

External links
 Jean-Luc Ponty - Electric Connection (1969) album review by Scott Yanow, credits & releases at AllMusic
 
 Jean-Luc Ponty - Electric Connection (1969) album to be listened as stream on Spotify

Jean-Luc Ponty albums
1969 albums
Albums arranged by Gerald Wilson